"Unity" is a song recorded by Afrika Bambaataa and James Brown as a duet in 1984. It was the first recording in which Brown collaborated with a performer associated with hip hop, a then-new
idiom heavily influenced by Brown's own funk music. The record's title and its cover showing the two performers clasping hands express solidarity between the two styles. The song's music is similar in its structure to Brown's own funk songs of the late 1960s and 1970s, but uses the drum machine and keyboard-generated timbres of electro. The song's rapped lyrics are on the themes of "Peace, unity, love, and having fun". The single charted #87 R&B.

"Unity" contains several references to Brown's earlier recordings. The song's a cappella opening paraphrases the beginning of his 1970 songs "Get Up, Get Into It and Get Involved", "Soul Power" and an instrumental passage in the middle of part 1 is borrowed from his 1969 hit "Give It Up or Turnit a Loose".

Music video
A videotape was shot of the vocal recordings of the song in Studio A at Unique Recording Studios, NYC. The tape was given to Fred Seibert and Alan Goodman of Fred/Alan Inc. to make into an inexpensive music video. The team worked with their in-house producer/director Tom Pomposello and creative director Marcy Brafman and Peter Caesar to create the video.

The video entered rotation on MTV in mid-October 1984.

Personnel
 James Brown - co-lead vocal
 Afrika Bambaataa - co-lead vocal
 "Chops" - horns
 Brian Banks- keyboards
 Anthony Marinelli - keyboards
 Robin Halpin - keyboards
 Skip McDonald - guitar
 Doug Wimbish - bass
 Keith LeBlanc - drums

12" version
A six-part version of "Unity" was released as a 12" record:

 Unity (Part 1: The Third Coming) - 3:20
 Unity (Part 2: Because It's Coming) - 3:20
 Unity (Part 3: Nuclear Wildstyle) - 3:29
 Unity (Part 4: Can You See It) - 6:47
 Unity (Part 5: The Light) - 4:15
 Unity (Part 6: World War 3) - 2:44

References

External links
 [ Review of the Unity 12"] from Allmusic

James Brown songs
1984 singles
Afrika Bambaataa songs
Male vocal duets
Songs written by James Brown
1984 songs
Tommy Boy Records singles